Vitali Akhramenko (Belarusian: Віталь Ахраменка; born November 22, 1977) is a Belarusian Heavyweight kickboxer and a former World Muay Thai champion. He is trained by Andrei Gridin and is fighting out of Chinuk Gym, Minsk, Belarus. He made his K-1 debut in 2001 at K-1 Czech Grand Prix 2001 in Prague against Takeru.

Biography and career 
Akhramenko had a successful amateur career, winning three world and European titles in thaiboxing. On November 2, 1998, he won a gold medal at European Open Muaythai Championships in Kyiv, Ukraine. After making his K-1 debut in 2001 he fought on various K-1 tournaments in Europe. He also works as a trainer at Chinuk Gym and is the sparring partner of Zabit Samedov

In July 2006 Akhramenko was sentenced to jail for attempted armed robbery. He was on parole for previous convictions of beating a police officer and possession of drugs.

On September 6, 2009, Akhramenko made his return to the ring after completing a three-year jail sentence. He won the fight against Evgeny Makarov by unanimous decision.

On November 26, 2011, he won the 2011 Fight Code Dragons Tournament by beating Freddy Kemayo in the final.

After a year out of the ring, Akhramenko was scheduled to face Elvin Abbasov at Mustang Knockout Fight Night in Minsk on November 18, 2012. Fight never happened due to unknown reasons.

He fought Jérôme Le Banner for the W.K.N. Kickboxing Oriental World Super Heavyweight title at Fight Night Saint-Tropez in Saint-Tropez, France on August 5, 2013, losing by KO in round two.

Titles

Professional
2011 Fight Code Rhinos Tournament Champion
 2010 Tatneft Arena World Cup 2010 champion +80 kg
 2004 K-1 Italy Grand Prix 2004 in Milan tournament runner up
 2003 Cup of Arbat Tournament champion -91 kg
 2003 Belorussian Muaythai champion
 2002 Belorussian Muaythai champion

Amateur
 1999 W.A.K.O. World Championships in Caorle, Italy  -75 kg (Thai-boxing)
 1998 European Open Muaythai Championships  -75 kg

Kickboxing record

|- 
|-  bgcolor="#FFBBBB"
| 2013-08-04 || Loss ||align=left| Jérôme Le Banner || Fight Night Saint Tropez || Saint-Tropez, France || TKO (Ref. Stop/Right Low Kick) || 2 ||  
|-
! style=background:white colspan=9 |
|- 
|-  bgcolor="#CCFFCC"
| 2011-11-26 || Win ||align=left| Freddy Kemayo || Fight Code: Rhinos Series, Finals || Geneva, Switzerland || Decision (Unanimous) || 3 || 3:00
|-
! style=background:white colspan=9 |
|-
|-  bgcolor="#CCFFCC"
| 2011-11-26 || Win ||align=left| Pacome Assi || Fight Code: Rhinos Series, Semi Finals || Geneva, Switzerland || Decision (Unanimous) || 3 || 3:00
|-  bgcolor="#CCFFCC"
| 2011-10-22 || Win ||align=left| Zamig Athakishiyev || Fight Code: Rhinos Series, Quarter Finals || Moscow, Russia || Decision (Unanimous) || 3 || 3:00
|-  bgcolor="#CCFFCC"
| 2011-08-13 || Win ||align=left| Ivan Stanić || Fight Code: Rhinos Series, Final 16 (Part 3), Super Fight|| Debrecen, Hungary || Decision || 3 || 3:00
|-  bgcolor="#CCFFCC"
| 2011-05-01 || Win ||align=left| Gyorgy Mihalik || Fight Code: Dragons Round 3 || Budapest, Hungary || Decision (Unanimous) || 3 || 3:00 
|-  bgcolor="#CCFFCC"
| 2011-02-05 || Win ||align=left| Tomas Kohout || Fight Code: Rhinos Series, Final 16 (Part 1) || Nitra, Slovakia || Decision || 3 || 3:00
|-  bgcolor="#CCFFCC"
| 2010-10-22 || Win ||align=left| Ashwin Balrak || Tatneft Arena World Cup 2010 final (+80 kg) || Kazan, Russia || Decision (Unanimous) || 5 || 3:00
|-
! style=background:white colspan=9 |
|-
|-  bgcolor="#CCFFCC"
| 2010-07-29 || Win ||align=left| Ramazan Ramazanov || Tatneft Arena World Cup 2010 1/2 final (+80 kg) || Kazan, Russia || Decision (Unanimous) || 4 || 3:00
|-  bgcolor="#CCFFCC"
| 2010-05-13 || Win ||align=left| Alexander Vezhevatov || Tatneft Arena World Cup 2010 1/4 final (+80 kg) || Kazan, Russia || Ext.R KO (Left high kick) || 4 || 2:57
|-  bgcolor="#CCFFCC"
| 2010-04-11 || Win ||align=left| Evgeny Makarov || Fight Club "The Octopus" || Minsk, Belarus || TKO (Ref stop/punches) || 3 || 
|-  bgcolor="#CCFFCC"
| 2010-03-05 || Win ||align=left| Dino Čatipović || Tatneft Arena World Cup 2010 1/8 final (+80 kg) || Kazan, Russia || KO (Left punch) || 1 || 2:16
|-  bgcolor="#CCFFCC"
| 2009-12-13 || Win ||align=left| Sergey Doni || Fight Club "The Octopus" || Minsk, Belarus || Decision (Unanimous) || 3 || 3:00
|-  bgcolor="#CCFFCC"
| 2009-09-06 || Win ||align=left| Evgeny Makarov || Imperial Thaiboxing Tournament || Minsk, Belarus || Decision (Unanimous) || 3 || 3:00
|-  bgcolor="#FFBBBB"
| 2005-06-12 || Loss ||align=left| Gökhan Saki || It's Showtime 2005 Amsterdam || Amsterdam, Netherlands || KO (left low kick) || 4 || 0:45
|-  bgcolor="#CCFFCC"
| 2005-05-06 || Win ||align=left| Petar Majstorovic || K-1 Slovakia 2005 || Bratislava, Slovakia || Decision (Unanimous) || 3 || 3:00
|-  bgcolor="#FFBBBB"
| 2005-04-16 || Loss ||align=left| Badr Hari || K-1 Italy 2005 Oktagon || Milan, Italy || Decision (Unanimous) || 3 || 3:00
|-  bgcolor="#FFBBBB"
| 2005-03-12 || Loss ||align=left| Gregory Tony ||  || France || Decision (Unanimous) || 3 || 3:00
|-  bgcolor="#CCFFCC"
| 2004-12-19 || Win ||align=left| Mladen Brestovac || Heaven or Hell 5 || Prague, Czech Republic || Decision (Unanimous) || 3 || 3:00
|-  bgcolor="#CCFFCC"
| 2004-10-30 || Win ||align=left| Christophe Caron || Noc Bojovníkov  || Bratislava, Slovakia || KO (Low kicks) || 1 || 0:30
|-  bgcolor="#CCFFCC"
| 2004-10-25 || Win ||align=left| Tihamer Brunner || Heaven or Hell 4 || Prague, Czech Republic || Decision (Unanimous) || 3 || 3:00
|-  bgcolor="#CCFFCC"
| 2004-09-18 || Win ||align=left| Xhavit Bajrami || K-1 WKA Championships || Basel, Switzerland || Decision (Unanimous) || 5 || 3:00
|-  bgcolor="#FFBBBB"
| 2004-04-24 || Loss ||align=left| Jorgen Kruth || K-1 Italy Grand Prix 2004 in Milan || Milan, Italy || Decision (Unanimous) || 3 || 3:00
|-
! style=background:white colspan=9 |
|-
|-  bgcolor="#CCFFCC"
| 2004-04-24 || Win ||align=left| Freddy Kemayo || K-1 Italy Grand Prix 2004 in Milan || Milan, Italy || Decision (Majority) || 3 || 3:00
|-  bgcolor="#CCFFCC"
| 2004-04-24 || Win ||align=left| Ante Varnica || K-1 Italy Grand Prix 2004 in Milan || Milan, Italy || Decision (Unanimous) || 3 || 3:00
|-  bgcolor="#CCFFCC"
| 2003-10-31 || Win ||align=left| Dewey Cooper || K-1 Final Fight Stars War in Zagreb || Zagreb, Croatia || Decision (Unanimous) || 5 || 3:00
|-  bgcolor="#FFBBBB"
| 2003-06-14 || Loss ||align=left| Jerome Le Banner || K-1 World Grand Prix 2003 in Paris || Paris, France || KO (right punch) || 2 || 0:28
|-  bgcolor="#CCFFCC"
| 2003-04-16 || Win ||align=left| Sergei Gur || Cup of Arbat Tournament Finals (-93 kg) || Moscow, Russia || Decision (Unanimous) || 5 || 3:00
|-
! style=background:white colspan=9 |
|-
|-  bgcolor="#CCFFCC"
| 2003-04-09 || Win ||align=left| Andrei Kindrich || Cup of Arbat Tournament 1/2 finals (-93 kg) || Moscow, Russia || Decision (Unanimous) || 4 || 3:00
|-  bgcolor="#CCFFCC"
| 2003-04-02 || Win ||align=left| Bislan Dokayev || Cup of Arbat Tournament 1/4 finals (-93 kg) || Moscow, Russia || TKO (Corner stop/towel) || 2 || 3:00
|-  bgcolor="#FFBBBB"
| 2003-03-15 || Loss ||align=left| Jorgen Kruth || K-1 World Grand Prix 2003 Preliminary Scandinavia || Stockholm, Sweden || Decision (Unanimous) || 5 || 3:00
|-  bgcolor="#c5d2ea"
| 2002-04-13 || Draw ||align=left| Azem Maksutaj || K-1 Croatia Grand Prix 2002 || Zagreb, Croatia || Decision Draw || 5 || 3:00
|-  bgcolor="#CCFFCC"
| 2001-12-01 || Win ||align=left| Takeru || K-1 Czech Grand Prix 2001 in Prague || Prague, Czech Republic || Decision (Unanimous) || 5 || 3:00
|-  bgcolor="#FFBBBB"
| 2000-10-22 || Loss ||align=left| Perry Ubeda || It's Showtime - Exclusive || Haarlem, Netherlands || Decision (Unanimous) || 5 || 3:00
|-  bgcolor="#CCFFCC"
| 2000-03-13 || Win ||align=left| ||  Boxing Club "Reaktor" || Minsk, Belarus || KO || 1 || 
|-  bgcolor="#CCFFCC"
| 1999-11-28 || Win ||align=left| Andrei Kamilov || W.A.K.O. World Championships 1999 || Caorle, Italy || Decision || 4 || 2:00
|-
! style=background:white colspan=9 |
|-
|-  bgcolor="#CCFFCC"
| 1999|| Win ||align=left| Sauli Janhunen ||  IFMA Kings Cup 1999, -75 kg || Bangkok, Thailand || TKO (Referee stoppage) || 5 || 0:54
|-  bgcolor="#CCFFCC"
| 1999-04-23 || Win ||align=left| Mikhail Mikhaylov  ||  Casino "Konti": Belarus vs Russia || S-Pb, Russia || TKO (Corner stop/towel) || 4 || 3:00
|-  bgcolor="#CCFFCC"
| 1999-01-28 || Win ||align=left|  ||  Boxing Club "Rektor": Belarus vs Russia || Minsk, Belarus || Decision || 5 || 3:00
|-  bgcolor="#CCFFCC"
| 1998-11-02 || Win ||align=left| Andrei Kurakov ||  European Open Muaythai Championships || Kyiv, Ukraine || Decision || 5 || 2:00
|-
! style=background:white colspan=9 |
|-
|-
| colspan=9 | Legend:

See also 
List of K-1 events
List of K-1 champions
List of male kickboxers

References

1977 births
Living people
Belarusian male kickboxers
Middleweight kickboxers
Light heavyweight kickboxers
Cruiserweight kickboxers
Heavyweight kickboxers
Belarusian Muay Thai practitioners
Sportspeople from Minsk